Imkong L. Imchen is a politician from Nagaland, India. He was elected to Nagaland Legislative Assembly 5 times from Koridang Assembly constituency in 2003, 2008, 2013, 2018 and 2023 Nagaland Legislative Assembly election. He has earlier served as a minister in Nagaland Legislative Assembly.

References 

1950 births
Naga people
Living people
North-Eastern Hill University alumni
Naga People's Front politicians
Nationalist Democratic Progressive Party politicians
Nagaland MLAs 2003–2008
Nagaland MLAs 2008–2013
Nagaland MLAs 2013–2018
Nagaland MLAs 2018–2023